This is a list of electoral results for the electoral district of Nicklin in Queensland state elections.

Members for Nicklin

 Election declared void by the Court of Disputed Returns

Election results

Elections in the 2020s

Elections in the 2010s

Elections in the 2000s

Elections in the 1990s

 The court declared the 1989 election result void. Instead of a by-election, the ballot papers were recounted and the National Party candidate was declared the winner on the preference count.

Elections in the 1980s

References

Queensland state electoral results by district